Museum District may refer to one of several districts in various cities, so named for their concentration of museums:

 Museum District, Philadelphia, Pennsylvania
 Houston Museum District in Houston, Texas
Museum District (METRORail station) in said district of Houston
 Museum District, Richmond, Virginia
 Museum Planning Area in Singapore